Tarletonbeania is a genus of lanternfishes found in the Pacific Ocean.

Species
There are currently two recognized species in this genus:
 Tarletonbeania crenularis (D. S. Jordan & C. H. Gilbert, 1880) (Blue lanternfish)
 Tarletonbeania taylori Mead, 1953

References

Myctophidae
Marine fish genera
Taxa named by Carl H. Eigenmann
Taxa named by Rosa Smith Eigenmann